Natronincola ferrireducens is an anaerobic, obligately alkaliphilic, spore-forming and rod-shaped bacterium from the genus of Natronincola.

References

Clostridiaceae
Bacteria described in 2009
Bacillota